Chemax, the Mayan word meaning "tree of monkeys", is a town located in the east of Yucatán State, Mexico. It is from 1918, the head of Chemax Municipality.

External links
 

Populated places in Yucatán